The St. Peter's Church is a church in Melaka City, Melaka, Malaysia. It is the oldest functioning Roman Catholic Church in Malaysia.

History
The Portuguese occupation of Melaka ended when Melaka fell to the Dutch in 1641. This was followed by period of persecutions of the Catholics in Melaka by the Dutch. Churches were destroyed and Catholics were not permitted to have their own cemeteries or even pray in their homes. Priests were also forbidden from administering their flocks. The war of the Spanish Succession resulted in an alliance formed between the Portuguese and the Dutch in 1703. This resulted in the Dutch adopting a softer stance towards the Portuguese Catholics. After years of persecutions, a piece of land was donated by a Dutch convert and the St. Peter's Church was built in 1710.

Architecture
The facade and decorations of the church have a combination of eastern and western architecture. One of its bells was cast in Goa in 1608 and was salvaged from an older church the Dutch had burnt down. There is also an alabaster statue of the Lord Before the Resurrection.

See also
 List of tourist attractions in Melaka
 Christianity in Malaysia
 Se Cathedral

References

Churches completed in 1710
Roman Catholic churches in Malaysia
Churches in Malacca